Orekhovo-Borisovo Yuzhnoye District is a territorial division (a district, or raion) in Southern Administrative Okrug, one of the 125 in the federal city of Moscow, Russia. It is located in the south of the federal city. As of the 2010 Census, the total population of the district was 145,588.

History
The district is located on the spot of former villages of Orekhovo, Borisovo, Shipilovo, Zyablikovo, and Brateyevo. In the early 1970s, mass housing construction was started in the area, and a microdistrict was built there.

Municipal status
As a municipal division, the district is incorporated as Orekhovo-Borisovo Yuzhnoye Municipal Okrug.

References

Notes

Sources

Districts of Moscow